The  1958–59 Panhellenic Championship  was the 23rd season of the highest football league of Greece and the last one that was held with the system of qualifying rounds per local association, as from the following year the structure of Greek football changed with the introduction of Alpha Ethniki, as well as the other categories in following seasons. Olympiacos won their 15th championship (6 consecutive) after an interesting race with AEK Athens.

Compared to the previous season, the teams that participated in the final round of the championship decreased by 2 (10 out of 12) and resulted as follows:
Athenian Championship: The first 3 teams of the ranking.
Piraeus' Championship: The first 2 teams of the ranking.
Macedonian Championship: The first 2 teams of the ranking.
Regional Championships: The 2 winners (Northern and Southern Group).
An additional position was secured after a play-off round between the third teams Piraeus' and Macedonian Championship.
The qualifying round matches took place from 7 September 1958 to 14 January 1959, while the final round took place from 21 January to 21 June 1959. The point system was: Win: 3 points - Draw: 2 points - Loss: 1 point.

Qualification round

Athens Football Clubs Association

Piraeus Football Clubs Association

Macedonia Football Clubs Association

Piraeus/Macedonia 3rd teams play-offs

|}

Regional Championship

Northern Group

Southern Group A

Southern Group B

Southern Group play-offs

|}

Final round

League table

Results

Top scorers

External links
Rsssf, 1958-59 championship

Panhellenic Championship seasons
1958–59 in Greek football
Greek